Murder in Rio (German: Mord in Rio) is a 1963 West German-Brazilian crime film directed by Horst Hächler and starring Erika Remberg, Hellmut Lange and Gustavo Rojo.

The film's sets were designed by the art director Pierino Massenzi.

Cast
 Erika Remberg as Barbara Leen 
 Hellmut Lange as Peter Jordan 
 Gustavo Rojo as Dumont 
 Reinhard Kolldehoff as Harry 
 Eva Wilma as Leila 
 Hélio Souto as Juan 
 Pedro Paulo Hatheyer as Kommissar Moura
 Kleber Afonso
 Xandó Batista
 Astrogildo Filho
 Pietro B. Filizola
 Marina Freire
 Geórgia Gomide
 Stanislaw Gravisluk
 Luis Gustavo
 Francisco Pereira
 Américo Taricano
 Ingrid Thomas

References

Bibliography 
 Anke Finger, Gabi Kathöfer & Christopher Larkosh. KulturConfusão – On German-Brazilian Interculturalities. Walter de Gruyter, 2015.

External links 
 

1963 films
1963 crime films
German crime films
Brazilian crime films
West German films
1960s German-language films
Films directed by Horst Hächler
Films set in Rio de Janeiro (city)
1960s German films